Matt McGinn (born 26 December 1978) is a Northern Irish singer/songwriter, producer, multi-instrumentalist, and arranger. He has released several albums, as well as a number of E.P.s and collaborations with other artists.

Career
Matt McGinn became a professional musician in 2004 after leaving Queen's University in Belfast where he was reading music. Performing as a multi-instrumentalist and session musician guitarist with Juliet Turner and Gareth Dunlop, McGinn also found work as an engineer.

A songwriter and performer in his own right, as of 2018 McGinn had written and produced three albums.

In February 2012, McGinn played at the Belfast Nashville Festival, performing 'in the round' with Nanci Griffith. Later in 2012, and together with other contributors to the Northern Ireland Music Therapy Trust, McGinn recorded a CD of songs intended to support those with learning difficulties.

In 2014, he won RTÉ 2FM's competition 'Play the Picnic', giving unsigned artists the opportunity to play Ireland's largest festival, Electric Picnic. In a review of his 2015 album, Latter Day Sinner, Folk Radio UK described some of his recordings as "drawn[ing] comparisons to Glen Hansard but, there's definite hints of Paul Simon in there too".

In 2016, McGinn teamed up with fellow Northern Irish songwriters, Ben Glover & Malojian and toured Ireland and Europe under the moniker 'Northern Lights'.

His music production credits include Jack O'Neill, an award-winning album with Guys & Dolls, and the debut album of Na Leanai.

Personal
Matt McGinn was born in Newry, County Down on 26 December 1978. He now lives in Hilltown, County Down with his wife and family.

Selected discography

Albums
 2022 – Time Well Spent
 2020 – Lessons of War
 2018 – The End of the Common Man
 2015 – Latter Day Sinner
 2012 – Livin'

Collaborations and EPs
 2015 – Alasdair Roberts – Missed Flights & Fist Fights
 2014 – Ben Glover – Atlantic
 2012 – Ben Glover – The Crossroads Sessions

References

External links
 Official Website

1978 births
Living people
Singer-songwriters from Northern Ireland
Record producers from Northern Ireland
Multi-instrumentalists from Northern Ireland
21st-century male singers from Northern Ireland
Guitarists from Northern Ireland
Irish male guitarists
Tenors from Northern Ireland
Musicians from County Down
Rhythm guitarists
21st-century guitarists